Shepherdia rotundifolia, the roundleaf buffaloberry or silverleaf, is a  evergreen shrub in the oleaster family (Elaeagnaceae) that grows only in the Colorado Plateau (endemic) of the southwestern United States. The common name comes from western settlers using the cooked berries in a sauce for eating cooked buffalo meat.

Leaves and stems 
"Rotundifolia" is for the oval or egg-shaped leaves, which can vary to being lance shaped.

Inflorescence and fruit 
Flowers open from May to June and are yellowish. They are produced singly or in a cluster from leaf axils.

Fruits are elliptical, with star-shaped hairs.

Habitat and range 
It grows in mixed desert shrub, pinyon juniper woodland, and ponderosa pine forest communities as high as  elevations.

References 

rotundifolia
Flora of the Southwestern United States
Endemic flora of the United States
Flora without expected TNC conservation status